Donald MacGillivray Nicol,  (4 February 1923 – 25 September 2003) was an English Byzantinist.

Life 
Nicol was born in Portsmouth, Hampshire, to a Church of Scotland minister, and received a classical education at King Edward VII School in Sheffield and St Paul's School in London. Registering as a conscientious objector in 1941, he served in 1942–1946 in the Friends' Ambulance Unit, with which he first visited wartime Greece in 1944–1945, visiting Ioannina and the Meteora monasteries.

After earning his first Classics degree at Cambridge University, he returned to Greece in 1949–1950 as a member of the British School at Athens. During this time, he also visited Mount Athos, spending Easter 1949 at the Hilandar Monastery, and revisited Meteora. In 1950, Nicol married Joan Mary Campbell, with whom he had three sons. He completed his doctoral thesis for Pembroke College, Cambridge, in 1952. The thesis, on the medieval Despotate of Epirus, led to his first book, The Despotate of Epiros. His thesis supervisor was Steven Runciman, with whom Nicol formed a lifelong friendship, nurtured in the Athenaeum Club. 

On completion of his doctorate, Nicol's first academic posting was as Lecturer in Classics at the University College Dublin from 1952 to 1964. He spent 1964–1966 as visiting fellow at Dumbarton Oaks, and was then Senior Lecturer and Reader in Byzantine History, University of Edinburgh (1966–1970). In 1970 he was named to the historic chair of Koraës Professor of Modern Greek and Byzantine History, Language and Literature at the King's College London, a post he held until 1988. In 1977–1980 he was Assistant Principal of the King's College, and Vice-Principal in 1980–1981. From 1973 to 1983, he was the editor of the Byzantine and Modern Greek Studies journal, and served as president of the Ecclesiastical History Society in 1975–1976. In 1989–1992, he was director of the Gennadius Library (Γεννάδειος Βιβλιοθήκη) in Athens.

Nicol became a member of the Royal Irish Academy in 1960, President of the Ecclesiastical History Society (1975-76) and a Fellow of the British Academy in 1981. For his contributions to the history of medieval Epirus, the city of Arta made him an honorary citizen in 1990, and he was awarded an honorary doctorate by the University of Ioannina in 1997. He died in Cambridge in 2003.

Works

Sources

References

1923 births
2003 deaths
Writers from Portsmouth
People educated at King Edward VII School, Sheffield
People educated at St Paul's School, London
British conscientious objectors
Calvinist pacifists
People associated with the Friends' Ambulance Unit
Academics of King's College London
Academics of the University of Edinburgh
Alumni of Pembroke College, Cambridge
British Byzantinists
Fellows of the British Academy
Presidents of the Ecclesiastical History Society
Members of the Royal Irish Academy
Academics of University College Dublin
Historians of medieval Greece
Scholars of Byzantine history